A boat lift is a machine for transporting boats between water at two different elevations.

Boat lift or Boatlift may also refer to:
 The Boatlift, an album by rapper Pitbull
 Mariel boatlift, a mass emigration of Cubans for the United States, 1980
 The maritime response following the September 11 attacks on the World Trade Center, 2001
 Boatlift: An Untold Tale of 9/11 Resilience, a 2011 documentary of the maritime response narrated by Tom Hanks
 Shiplift, a device to lift small watercraft above the water level at a dock for storage